Miliolana is a subclass established by Saidova, 1981 that comprises porcelaneous members of the Miliolata from the Cornuspirida, Miliolida with agglutinated forms removed to the Miliamminana, and Soritida. Included are  both free and attached forms, some coiled with two chambers per whorl arranged in different planes, others that are irregular or have serial chambers, and still others are fusiform with complex interiors, superficially resembling the Fusulinacea. The unifying character is their imperforate porcelaneous tests.

References
Miliolata-Foraminifera
Alfred R Loeblich jr & Helen Tappan,1964. Treatise on Invertebrate Paleontology, Part C, Protista 2; Sarcodina, chiefly "Thecamoibians" and Foraminiferida.  Geological Society of America and University of Kansas Press.

Foraminifera
SAR supergroup subclasses